Cantagallo is a comune (municipality) in the Province of Prato in the Italian region Tuscany, located about  northwest of Florence and about  north of Prato.

Geography
Cantagallo borders the following municipalities: Barberino di Mugello, Camugnano, Montale, Montemurlo, Pistoia, Sambuca Pistoiese, Vaiano, and Vernio.

Frazioni
Luicciana
Cambiaticcio
Carmignanello
Castello Averardi
Montagnana (Cantagallo)
Cerbaia
Codilupo
Colle Bisenzio
Fossato (Cantagallo)
Gavigno
Gricigliana
Il Fabbro
L'Acqua
La Dogana Il Pucci
La Villa (Cantagallo)
Luicciana
Migliana
Pratale
Trairio
Usella
Luogomano-Acquerino

Nature
Reserve Luogomano-Acquerino
Passo del Tabernacolo
Pian della Rasa

Culture
Events in the municipality include:

Old villages and ancient flavors in Luicciana (November)
Mountain in feast in Cascina Spedalletto-reserve Luogomano-Acquerino (July)
Feast of the chestnut in Migliana (October–December)
Feast of the garlic bread in Gavigno (August)
Feast of the boar in Gavigno (July)
Feast of the potato in La Villa (September)
Feast of the zonzella in Gavigno (June)
Sant'Anna feast in Cantagallo (July)
Tour of the cribs in Migliana (December–January)

Main sights

Churches
San Biagio in Cantagallo
San Lorenzo in Usella
San Michele in Luicciana
San Donato in L'Acqua
San Lorenzo in Fossato
San Michele in Codilupo
San Rocco in Fossato
Oratory of Sant'Agostino in Gavigno
Santa Caterina d'Alessandria in Gricigliana
Santa Caterina d'Alessandria in Carmignanello
Santa Maria in Castello Averardi
Santa Maria Assunta in Migliana
Santa Maria Assunta oratory in Migliana - old church

Villas
Villa Novellucci in Gricigliana
Villa Guicciardini in Il Fabbro
Villa Bini in Pratale

Other sights
Sessanto bridge in Carmignanello
Medieval bridge in Cerbaia
Cerbaia fortress in Cerbaia
Pispola mill in Cerbaia
Adventure park in Gavigno - between Gavigno and Passo del Tabernacolo

References

External links